A list of films produced in Hong Kong in 1966:.

1966

References

External links
 IMDB list of Hong Kong films
 Hong Kong films of 1966 at HKcinemamagic.com

1966
Hong Kong
Films